The Fender Hot Rod DeVille is a combo tube guitar amplifier manufactured and sold by Fender. It was introduced in 1996 as part of Fender's Hot Rod line of amplifiers, and since then has been in continuous production. The Hot Rod DeVille is a modified version of the earlier Fender Blues DeVille from the Blues amplifier line, and has a higher level of gain in its preamplification signal. The DeVille incorporates a 60 watt amplifier, and is available in two different models: a 212, which includes a pair of  Celestion A-Type 12" speakers, and the 410, which includes four 10" speakers. The DeVille is the sister amplifier of the Fender Hot Rod Deluxe.

Specifications 

Both the 212 and 410 feature three channels: normal, drive, and more drive. These channels are selectable via the "Channel Select" and "More Drive" buttons on either the control panel or footswitch (included), and they share EQ. Other features include a Bass, Middle, and Treble EQ, Master Volume, Presence, Normal/Bright switch, standby switch, preamp out and return for an effects loop configuration, and a Fender long-spring reverb (solid state for both the driver and the recovery circuits).  An external speaker jack is located next to the output tubes in the back and allows the signal to be heard out of both the amplifier itself and the speakers to which it is connected (which must have a 4- or 8-Ohm impedance).

The DeVille features a 60-watt valve amplifier with three 12AX7 preamp valves and two 6L6 output valves. Its circuitry includes full PCB with valves and pots mounted directly to the circuit board. The speakers included are of the Fender Special Design Eminence series, the 212 containing a pair of 12” Celestion A-Type speakers and the 410 featuring four 10” speakers. Both consume 180 watts of power. The 410 amp weighs about 50lbs.

See also
Fender Hot Rod Deluxe

References

External links
Hot Rod Deville at Fender.com
Hot Rod Deville 410 consumer reviews at Harmony Central
Hot Rod Deville 212 consumer reviews at Harmony Central

Hot Rod DeVille